Following is a list of dams and reservoirs in Rhode Island.

All major dams are linked below.

Dams and reservoirs in Rhode Island 

Manville Dam on the Blackstone River.

This list is incomplete.  You can help Wikipedia by expanding it.

 Diamond Hill Reservoir Dam, Diamond Hill Reservoir, City of Pawtucket
 Gainer Memorial Dam, Scituate Reservoir, City of Providence

References 

Rhode Island
Dams
Dams